Milesville is an unincorporated community in southwestern Caswell County, North Carolina, United States, located east of Cherry Grove.

Unincorporated communities in Caswell County, North Carolina
Unincorporated communities in North Carolina